Ambarishbhai Jivabhai Der is an Indian National Congress politician from the state of Gujarat, India. He is a member of Gujarat Legislative Assembly elected from Rajula Assembly constituency. He is also the working president of Gujarat Pradesh Congress Committee.

References

Indian National Congress politicians from Gujarat
Living people
1977 births
Gujarat MLAs 2017–2022